Netaji Mahavidyalaya, also known as Kalipur College, is one of the oldest colleges in Arambagh,  in the Hooghly district, West Bengal, India. It offers undergraduate courses in Arts, Commerce and Sciences. It is affiliated to  University of Burdwan.
It was established in 1948.

History
People of Arambagh participated in freedom struggle. After independent Netaji Mahavidyalaya was an outcome development work started. Prafulla Sen & some others initiated the isea for establishing a college in a place near by present hospital. But Radhakrishna Pal & some others started it at Kalipur, western part of the Darkeswar.
During 1966 students of Netaji Mahavidyalaya had organised movement for development of the college, which later turned to anti Prafulla Sen movement; rather anti Govt. movement. Students leaders Abdul Mannan, Narayan Ch Ghosh, Banibikash Mallick etc. forming Arambagh Mahkuma Chhatra Sangram Committee agitated students and as result Profulla Sen lost his seat. It was a turning point in West Bengal politics.
Later Narayan Ch Ghosh, former student of Netaji Mahavidyalaya had written mathematics books which were published by West Bengal Board of Secondary Education after revision by the experts and those books were taught in all the schools of West Bengal & Tripurah.

Departments

Science
Chemistry
Physics
Mathematics
Botany
Zoology
Computer Science
Environmental Science
Plant Protection
Computer Application
BCA (H)

Arts and Commerce
Bengali
English
Sanskrit
Santali
History
Geography
Political Science
Philosophy
Economics
Education
Physical Education
Commerce
Music
BBA

Accreditation
Recently, Netaji Mahavidyalaya has been re-accredited and awarded B++ grade by the National Assessment and Accreditation Council (NAAC). The college is also recognized by the University Grants Commission (UGC).

See also

References

External links
Netaji Mahavidyalaya
 

Colleges affiliated to University of Burdwan
Educational institutions established in 1948
Universities and colleges in Hooghly district
1948 establishments in West Bengal
Memorials to Subhas Chandra Bose